The ARIA Hip Hop/R&B Singles Chart, formerly the ARIA Urban Singles Chart, ranks the best performing hip hop and R&B tracks within Australia and is provided by the Australian Recording Industry Association.

History
The ARIA Hip Hop/R&B Singles Chart was established as the Urban Singles Chart in 2001 and first published on 1 January of that year. The chart still runs weekly . The current number one is "Boy's a Liar" by PinkPantheress.

Trivia

Songs with the most weeks at number one
38 weeks
The Kid Laroi and Justin Bieber – "Stay" (2021–2022)
23 weeks
The Weeknd – "Starboy" (2016–2017)
22 weeks
Lil Nas X – "Old Town Road" (2019)
20 weeks
Post Malone and Swae Lee – "Sunflower" (2018–2019)
19 weeks
The Weeknd – "Blinding Lights" (2020)
17 weeks
LMFAO featuring Lauren Bennett and GoonRock – "Party Rock Anthem" (2011)
Macklemore and Ryan Lewis featuring Eric Nally, Melle Mel, Kool Moe Dee and Grandmaster Caz – "Downtown" (2015–2016)
16 weeks
Macklemore featuring Ryan Lewis and Wanz – "Thrift Shop" (2012–2013)
15 weeks
24kGoldn and Iann Dior – "Mood" (2020–2021)
Jack Harlow – "First Class" (2022)
14 weeks
Akon featuring Eminem – "Smack That" (2006–2007)
13 weeks
Eminem – "Lose Yourself" (2002–2003)
Justice Crew – "Que Sera" (2014)
12 weeks
Eminem – "Without Me" (2002)
Wiz Khalifa featuring Charlie Puth – "See You Again" (2015)
Post Malone featuring 21 Savage – "Rockstar" (2017–2018)
The Kid Laroi – "Without You" (2021)
11 weeks
The Black Eyed Peas – "Boom Boom Pow" (2009)
Robin Thicke – "Blurred Lines" (2013)
Mark Ronson featuring Bruno Mars – "Uptown Funk" (2014–2015)
Drake – "God's Plan" (2018)

Artists with the most number ones
This list includes main artists and featured artists.
Rihanna (15)
Eminem (12)
The Black Eyed Peas (8)
Flo Rida (8)
Drake (7)
Jason Derulo (6)
Nelly (6)
Post Malone (6)
Lil Wayne (5)
Beyoncé (5)
Nicki Minaj (4)
Usher (4)
The Weeknd (4)

Cumulative weeks at number one
Rihanna (97)
Eminem (67)
Post Malone (55)
The Weeknd (55)
Flo Rida (50)
The Kid Laroi (50)
Justin Bieber (48)
The Black Eyed Peas (42)
Drake (40)
Jason Derulo (28)
Nelly (27)
Nicki Minaj (25)
Lil Nas X (22)
Usher (22)
21 Savage (17)

See also
ARIA Charts

References

Australian record charts